Chromidotilapiini is a tribe of small cichlids from tropical West and Middle Africa. There are thirteen genera and over fifty described species in this tribe.

Genera
The following genera are classified within the tribe Chromidotilapiini:

 Benitochromis Lamboj, 2001
 Chromidotilapia Boulenger, 1898
 Congochromis Stiassny & Schliewen, 2007
 Divandu Lamboj & Snoeks, 2000
 Enigmatochromis Lamboj 2009
 Limbochromis Greenwood, 1987
 Nanochromis Pellegrin, 1904
 Parananochromis Greenwood, 1987
 Pelmatochromis Steindachner, 1894
 Pelvicachromis Thys van den Audenaerde, 1968
 Teleogramma Boulenger, 1899
 Thysochromis Daget 1988
 Wallaceochromis  Lamboj, Trummer & Metscher 2016

The genus Pelmatochromis is sometimes placed in its own clade, informally referred to as the pelmatochromines, and this as the Pelmatochromini, may be the sister taxon to the Chromidotilapiini.

References

External links 
 
 helsinki.fi

 
Cichlid fish of Africa
Pseudocrenilabrinae
Fish tribes